Tapachula International Airport , Aeropuerto Internacional de Tapachula, is an international airport located  at Tapachula, Chiapas, is Mexico's southernmost airport. It handles national and international air traffic for the city of Tapachula, Port of Chiapas and the Soconusco region.

General Information
The airport is operated by Grupo Aeroportuario del Sureste (ASUR). In 2021, the airport handled 424,249 passengers, and in 2022 it handled 503,254 passengers.

Airlines and destinations

Statistics

Passengers

Busiest routes

See also 

 List of the busiest airports in Mexico

References

External links
 Tapachula Intl. Airport

Airports in Chiapas
WAAS reference stations
Airfields of the United States Army Air Forces Air Transport Command in Central America
Airfields of the United States Army Air Forces